Clavatula cossignanii is a species of sea snail, a marine gastropod mollusk in the family Clavatulidae.

Description
The shell grows to a length of 13 mm.

Distribution
This species occurs in the Atlantic Ocean off Senegal.

References

External links
 

cossignanii
Gastropods described in 2004